Forest Park–DeBaliviere is a St. Louis MetroLink station. It is located at the northeast corner of Forest Park Parkway and DeBaliviere Avenue and is the primary transfer point for trips between the Red and Blue lines.

History 
The station opened on July 31, 1993, as one of the original stations in the MetroLink system. It was originally constructed with side platforms and a single entrance serving the westbound platform. 

Access to the eastbound platform required walking the length of the westbound platform and crossing the tracks at the end. As part of the Cross-County extension of MetroLink from Forest Park–DeBaliviere to Shrewsbury-Lansdowne I-44, the station was reconstructed with an island platform to allow easy cross platform transfers between the Blue and Red lines and two station entrances, one on either side of DeBaliviere Avenue.

In 2016, Metro's Arts in Transit program commissioned the work Vehicle.Destination.Imagination. by Con Christeson and Catharine Magel for installation on the south retaining wall at the station. The mural combines three-dimensional elements with vibrant colors to celebrate the spirit of the St. Louis region.

2022 Flooding 
On July 26, 2022, the Forest Park-DeBaliviere and Delmar Loop stations were flooded in a catastrophic flash flooding event that shut the system down for close to 72 hours. Damage to the stations, rolling stock, ballast, signaling infrastructure, fiber optics, etc. is estimated to be $40 million.

On September 5, 2022, Metro announced new schedules to accommodate repairs being made to the system. It is estimated repairs could take six months or longer.

Location 
This station is located just to the north of Forest Park. Attractions in the park include the St. Louis Art Museum, Saint Louis Zoo, Missouri History Museum and The Muny in addition to athletic fields, biking and running trails, and golf courses. 

In 2022, two large developments opened on the former park and ride lot and strip mall adjacent to the station. One of the largest transit oriented developments in St. Louis to date, the two projects brought 437 new residential units and nearly 40,000 square feet of new commercial space to the area surrounding the station.

The Loop Trolley system, a heritage streetcar service that travels along DeBaliviere Avenue and Delmar Boulevard to the Loop, and operates from about April to October, has a stop adjacent to the entrance of the MetroLink station.

Station layout
The platform is accessed via an elevator or set of stairs on either the east or west side of DeBaliviere Avenue.

References

External links
 St. Louis Metro

MetroLink stations in St. Louis
Railway stations in the United States opened in 1993
Delmar Loop Trolley
Blue Line (St. Louis MetroLink)
Red Line (St. Louis MetroLink)